KLM Flight 823 was an air accident in 1961 involving a Lockheed L-188 Electra aircraft that crashed on approach to Cairo International Airport in Egypt after a flight from Rome in Italy. The crash killed 20 out of 36 passengers and crew on flight 823.

Aircraft
The accident aircraft was an American built Lockheed L-188 Electra turboprop-powered airliner, registration PH-LLM, built in 1960.

Accident
KLM Flight 823 took off from Amsterdam on 11 June on a flight to Kuala Lumpur with stopovers at Munich, Rome, Cairo, and Karachi. Twenty-nine passengers and seven crew were aboard the aircraft on the third leg of the planned schedule, between Rome and Cairo.  At 04:11 local time, the aircraft was on approach to runway 34 at Cairo International Airport but struck high ground about 4 km (2.5 mi) south of the airport.  The aircraft broke up on impact, with both sections catching fire. Seventeen passengers and three crew were killed.

Cause
The cause of the crash of KLM Flight 823 was attributed to pilot error, being blamed on the pilot-in-command not paying sufficient attention to his instruments.

References

External links
Accident Details KLM Flight 823 at planecrahinfo.com

Aviation accidents and incidents in 1961
Aviation accidents and incidents in Egypt
Accidents and incidents involving the Lockheed L-188 Electra
823
Airliner accidents and incidents caused by pilot error
1961 in Egypt
June 1961 events in Africa